The following is a list of the monastic houses in Staffordshire, England.

See also
 List of monastic houses in England

Notes

References

Medieval sites in England
Houses in Staffordshire
Staffordshire
Staffordshire
Lists of buildings and structures in Staffordshire